Holbeach Air Weapons Range is a United Kingdom Ministry of Defence academic air weapons range (AWR) situated between Boston and King's Lynn in the civil parish of Gedney on The Wash, in Lincolnshire, eastern England.

It was originally associated with RAF Sutton Bridge, but in the 1950s was named Royal Air Force Holbeach before adopting its current name in the mid 2000s when control was passed to the Defence Training Estate.

History
The remote air range opened in 1926 as an air gunnery range attached to and established by Royal Air Force Practice Camp Sutton Bridge (later named RAF Sutton Bridge). Use of the range began on 27 September 1926, with biplanes firing and dropping bombs over the area formally known as "Holbeach Air Gunnery and Bombing Range", and colloquially simply as Holbeach Marsh Range.

During the late 1950s, when RAF Sutton Bridge was reduced to a care and maintenance role, the coastal marshland air gunnery range was renamed to RAF Holbeach Bombing Range and it became later parented to RAF Marham as an Air Weapons Range (AWR) within RAF Strike Command. On 1 April 2006 the defence estates' administration was transferred to the Ministry of Defence—Defence Training Estate East (DTE East), located at West Tofts Camp in West Tofts near Thetford in Norfolk; now renamed Defence Infrastructure Organisation East (DIO East).

DIO are responsible for operational support—planning, building, maintaining and servicing the 'Holbeach Air Weapons Range' infrastructure. The air range estate is administered at a local level by a DIO Training Safety Officer (TSO), who is responsible for the day-to-day delivery of a safe training environment. RAF Air Command, who is the top level budget holder, control the core RAF station site which encompasses an area of 716 hectares. RAF air traffic control personnel staff the air range control tower supported by civilian range staff outsourced to Landmarc Solutions.

Facilities
Since 1993 this has included night bombing and helicopter operations. The range training facilities are used by air force squadrons stationed in the United Kingdom and occasionally by units flying directly from airbases in Europe. An array of  eight static range targets, include several retired merchant ships which have been beached on the sands of The Wash for this purpose. Observation towers ("Quadrants") parallel to the target line are manned and allow the fall of aircraft ordnance to be calculated for accuracy by means of triangulation. The range includes a helicopter landing pad near the main control tower and since 2010 a new range headquarters building.

Most of the air range, including the control tower and four observation towers (Quadrants) are in the parish hamlets of Dawsmere and Gedney Drove End, but it does overlap with Holbeach to the west. On UK Civil Aviation Authority issued aeronautical charts the military Danger Area is found marked and identified by the code WRDA D207/II or the ICAO code EG D207 (Weapons Range Danger Area or United Kingdom Danger - 207), the danger altitude is usually up to twenty-three thousand feet AMSL.

Past activity 
In the past Holbeach Air Gunnery Bombing Range has served the intense activity of many types of British and foreign military aircraft using its target training range facilities. For example, from now historical propeller biplane types such as the Armstrong Whitworth Siskin, Hawker Woodcock, Gloster Grebe, Gloster Gamecock, Fairey III, Fairey Flycatcher, Bristol Bulldog, Hawker Fury and Gloster Gauntlet. Then the Bristol Blenheim, Fairey Battle, Hawker Hurricane, Supermarine Spitfire, de Havilland Mosquito, Westland Lysander, North American P-51 Mustang and Grumman Avenger, to now decommissioned succeeding jet aircraft types such as the Gloster Meteor, English Electric Canberra, de Havilland Venom, Hawker Hunter, USAF F-100D Super Sabre, Blackburn Buccaneer, McDonnell Douglas F-4 Phantom II,  USAF General Dynamics F-111 Aardvark, Harrier jump jet, SEPECAT Jaguar and Panavia Tornado, to name a few. Including, the still in service USAF F-16 Fighting Falcon, USAF B-1 Lancer, USAF B-2 Spirit, IAF Sukhoi Su-35, USAF HH-60G Pave Hawk (from 56th Rescue Squadron) and USAF A-10 Thunderbolt.

Present activity 
At the present time current aircraft types such as the Eurofighter Typhoon, Lockheed Martin F-35B Lightning II (No. 617 Squadron RAF), USAF McDonnell Doughlas F-15 Eagle/F-15E Strike Eagle (from 48th Fighter Wing), BAE Hawk trainer and AgustaWestland Apache AH1 helicopters can be seen operating on the range at various times of the day, including on occasions USAF Bell Boeing CV-22B Osprey (from 7th Special Operations Squadron), USAF Lockheed Martin F-35A Lightning II (495th Fighter Squadron), Boeing Chinook, AgustaWestland AW159 Wildcat, AugustaWestland Merlin and Aerospatiale Puma HC helicopters. The range also hosts frequent forward air control (FAC) or joint terminal attack controller (JTAC) exercises.

Strafing target courts

RAF Holbeach also has facilities (strafing courts) for scoring aircraft strafing runs (aircraft firing runs on ground targets) using acoustic sensor scoring systems. The ground strafing targets consist of several four-metre square nets, each with an orange centred square bullseye. The Acoustic Air Weapons Scoring System (AWSS) which is located beneath a protection berm focus on the target screen and run at high speed, catching the supersonic profile of the incoming projectile, and triangulating its position concurrent with counting the event.  The AWSS sensor modes can display rounds per minute results and the location of the strafe projectiles in the target area. The angle of attack and the horizontal approach angle are also calculated. This result is transmitted to the control tower, where it is displayed to the Air Traffic Controller for relaying to the pilot. The range also has semi-automatic bomb and rocket scoring systems.

Heraldic badge
The station's RAF heraldic badge features a vertical sword through a crown. The circular frame coloured with RAF blue reads 'Royal Air Force Station Holbeach' and the motto is Defend and Strike.

References

External links
 Video Footage: July 2013 - Tornado GR4 and Hawk Trainer aircraft practising at RAF Holbeach Bombing Range. via YouTube
 Video Footage: March 2013 - F-15Es, Apache and Tornado aircraft practising over RAF Holbeach Bombing Range. via YouTube
 Video Footage: August 2011 - showing A-10C Thunderbolts practising at RAF Holbeach Bombing Range. via YouTube
 Video Footage: August 1991 - showing aircraft SEPECAT Jaguar, Belgium Air Force Mirage, A-10 Thunderbolt, Tornado and F-111 Aardvark practising at RAF Holbeach Bombing Range. via YouTube

 Airfield Viewing Guide - RAF Holbeach Thunder & Lightnings 
 Queen Elizabeth enjoyed detonating an unexploded dummy bomb at RAF Holbeach on 4 February 2008

Royal Air Force stations in Lincolnshire
South Holland, Lincolnshire
Bombing ranges
Military units and formations established in 1926